Lysinibacillus telephonicus is a Gram-positive, aerobic, rod-shaped, endospore-forming and motile bacterium from the genus of Lysinibacillus which has been isolated from the screen of a cellular phone.

References

Bacillaceae
Bacteria described in 2017